Jocara trabalis is a species of snout moth in the genus Jocara. It was described by Augustus Radcliffe Grote in 1881. It is found in North America, including Alabama, Arizona, British Columbia, California, Colorado, Nevada, New Mexico, Texas and Washington.

The larvae have been recorded on Abies balsamea.

References

External link

Moths described in 1881
Jocara